Tabūʿa was a queen regnant of the Nomadic Arab tribes of Qedar. She ruled in the 7th century BC, circa 675 BC.  She succeeded queen Te'el-hunu.

Life 

Tabua was the fifth of six Arab queens to be attested (as sarratu) in Assyrian documents between Tiglath-pileser III and Assurbanipal: Zabibe, Samsi, Yatie, Te'el-hunu, Tabua and Adia, the first five of them rulers.  Accoridning to Assyrians texts, she also served as apkal-latu (priestess) of her people.

In 690 BC, the Assyrians under Sennacherib put an end to any potential threat to Assyria from the Southwest after the defeat of queen Te'el-hunu and her "male associate" Kaza'il, pillaged Adummatu and brought the queen captive to Nineveh with a great booty of camels, divine statues, spices and jewels.

When Esarhaddon became king of Assyria, he made peace with the Qedarites in Adummatu by sending back the divine statues of Alilat, Nuhay and Orotalt along with Princess Tabua, the relative and successor of Te'el-hunu, who may have been the daughter of Te'el-hunu and Sennacherib.  Tabua had been raised in the royal palace of Sennacherib and was placed upon the throne as an ally of the Assyrians. Initially, she appears to have been accepted by the Quedarites, but after but a short reign, she seems to have been replaced by them.

References

Arab queens
Midian
Ancient queens regnant
7th-century BC women rulers
7th-century BC Arabs
Year of birth missing
Year of death missing
Ancient Near Eastern women